Jørn Dohrmann (born 9 January 1969) is a Danish politician and Member of the European Parliament (MEP) from Denmark. He is a member of the Danish People's Party, part of the European Conservatives and Reformists. He was a member of the Folketing from 2001 to 2014. In 2014 he was elected to the European Parliament for European Conservatives and Reformists.

References

1969 births
Living people
People from Kolding
Danish People's Party politicians
Danish People's Party MEPs
MEPs for Denmark 2014–2019
Europe of Freedom and Democracy MEPs
Members of the Folketing 2001–2005
Members of the Folketing 2005–2007
Members of the Folketing 2007–2011
Members of the Folketing 2011–2015